Riley Kenneth Pint (born November 6, 1997) is an American professional baseball pitcher in the Colorado Rockies organization. He was drafted fourth overall in the 2016 Major League Baseball draft by the Rockies.

Amateur career
Pint attended St. Thomas Aquinas High School in Overland Park, Kansas. As a freshman, he had a 3–2 win–loss record with a 3.19 earned run average (ERA), and 35 strikeouts. As a sophomore, Pint went 8–0 with a 2.58 ERA and 57 strikeouts. As a junior, he was 5–2 with a 2.20 ERA and 47 strikeouts. Prior to his senior year, Pint and Jason Groome were the only two high school students on the Golden Spikes Award watchlist. Pint also played basketball in high school.

Professional career
Pint was considered a top prospect for the 2016 Major League Baseball draft. He was drafted by the Colorado Rockies with the fourth overall pick of the draft. He was committed to Louisiana State University (LSU) to play college baseball, but signed with the Rockies. He spent his first professional season with the Grand Junction Rockies of the Rookie-level Pioneer League, where he posted a 1-5 record with a 5.35 ERA in 11 starts. Pint spent 2017 with the Asheville Tourists of the Class A South Atlantic League, where he pitched 93 innings and went 2-11 with a 5.42 ERA, 79 strikeouts, and 59 walks in 22 games started. He returned to Asheville to begin 2018, and injured his forearm in his first start, landing him on the 7-day disabled list. After returning from the injury, he was reassigned to the Boise Hawks and started three games for them, compiling a 1.13 ERA in eight innings pitched.

Pint returned to Asheville in 2019, but missed time due to injury; over  innings, he went 0-1 with an 8.66 ERA and 23 strikeouts. Pint did not play in a game in 2020 due to the cancellation of the minor league season because of the COVID-19 pandemic. To begin the 2021 season, he was assigned to the Spokane Indians of the High-A West League. He continued to struggle with his control, striking out 17 while walking 10 in  innings pitched, before he decided to retire on June 8, 2021.

On March 4, 2022, Pint un-retired and rejoined the Rockies organization. He split the season between the Double-A Hartford Yard Goats and the Triple-A Albuquerque Isotopes, logging a cumulative 2-2 record and 4.53 ERA with 58 strikeouts in 45.2 innings pitched across 41 appearances.

On November 15, 2022, the Rockies added Pint to the 40-man roster to protect him from the Rule 5 draft. Pint suffered a mild oblique strain during spring training and was optioned to Triple-A Albuquerque to begin the 2023 season.

References

External links

1997 births
Living people
Sportspeople from Overland Park, Kansas
Baseball players from Kansas
Baseball pitchers
Minor league baseball players
Grand Junction Rockies players
Boise Hawks players
Asheville Tourists players
Spokane Indians players
Hartford Yard Goats players